The 6th Beijing College Student Film Festival was held from 17 April to 2 May 1999 in Beijing, China. Be There or Be Square was the biggest winner, receiving three awards, including Favorite Actress Award, Favorite Film, and Best Visual Effects Award.

Awards
 Best Film Award: Not One Less
 Best Director Award: Teng Wenji for Rhapsody of Spring
 Best Actor Award: Teng Rujun for Postmen in the Mountains
 Best Actress Award: Tao Hong for A Beautiful New World
 Favorite Actor Award: Feng Gong for A Tree in House
 Favorite Actress Award: Xu Fan for Be There or Be Square
 Favorite Film: Be There or Be Square
 Best Visual Effects Award: Be There or Be Square
 Committee Special Award: Autumn Scenery in Hometown, Huishi Sanjiang
 Special Jury Award: Rhapsody of Spring
 Best First Film Award: Li Hong for Fly Away Home
 Special Education Award: Be Without You

References

External links

Beijing College Student Film Festival
1999 film festivals
1999 festivals in Asia
Bei